Ant Hill Glacier is a glacier in Antarctica, between Ant Hill and Bareface Bluff, rising in the Worcester Range and flowing northeast into Skelton Glacier. It was surveyed and named, in association with Ant Hill, in 1957 by the New Zealand party of the Commonwealth Trans-Antarctic Expedition, 1956–58.

See also
 List of glaciers in the Antarctic
 Glaciology

References
 

Glaciers of Hillary Coast